George Mosby Davison (March 23, 1855 – December 18, 1912) was a U.S. Representative from Kentucky.

Born in Stanford, Kentucky, Davison attended the common schools, Stanford Academy, and Meyers Academy.
He studied law.
He was admitted to the bar in 1879 and commenced practice in Stanford, Kentucky.
He was appointed collector of internal revenue for the sixth Kentucky district and served from July 20, 1885, to June 30, 1889.
He was appointed master of chancery or commissioner of the Lincoln circuit court in 1886, and served until 1893, when he resigned.
He served as member of the State house of representatives 1886–1888.
He served as judge of the Lincoln County Court 1894–1896.

Davison was elected as a Republican to the Fifty-fifth Congress (March 4, 1897 – March 3, 1899).
He was an unsuccessful candidate for reelection in 1898 to the Fifty-sixth Congress.
He resumed the practice of law.
He served as assistant United States attorney for the eastern district of Kentucky 1900–1910.
He retired from public life.
He died in Stanford, Kentucky, December 18, 1912.
He was interred in Buffalo Springs Cemetery.

References

1855 births
1912 deaths
People from Stanford, Kentucky
Republican Party members of the United States House of Representatives from Kentucky
Kentucky state court judges
19th-century American politicians
19th-century American judges